The Flint Boroughs by-election was a Parliamentary by-election held on 21 January 1913. The constituency returned one Member of Parliament (MP) to the House of Commons of the United Kingdom, elected by the first past the post voting system.

Vacancy
James Summers who had been Liberal MP for Flint Boroughs since January 1910, died on 1 January 1913.

Previous result

Candidates
The Liberals selected Thomas Parry to defend the seat. The constituency included Parry's home town of Mold where he was a prominent lawyer.

Campaign
The Liberals had held the seat since gaining it from the Conservatives in 1847.

Result

Aftermath
A General Election was due to take place by the end of 1915. By the summer of 1914, the following candidates had been adopted to contest that election. Due to the outbreak of war, the election never took place.

The constituency disappeared in boundary changes in 1918 so Parry transferred to the county seat of Flintshire. Parry received the coalition government coupon at the 1918 general election  and was returned unopposed

References

Further reading
Debrett's House of Commons 1916

1913 in Wales
1910s elections in Wales
1913 elections in the United Kingdom
By-elections to the Parliament of the United Kingdom in Welsh constituencies
History of Flintshire